Busani is a rural locality (a settlement) in Bauntovsky District, Republic of Buryatia, Russia. The population was 35 as of 2010. There is 1 street.

Geography 
Busani is located by lake Busani and to the south of Uakit village, 97 km north of Bagdarin (the district's administrative centre) by road.

References 

Rural localities in Bauntovsky District